Concepcion, officially the Municipality of Concepcion, is a 1st class municipality in the province of Tarlac, Philippines. According to the 2020 census, it has a population of 169,953 people.

History 
In 1860, the towns of Concepcion and Magalang comprised a single town named San Bartolome (presently a barangay of Concepcion), which was a military Commandancia of Pampanga under the Spanish regime.

A catastrophic flood devastated the whole settlement of San Bartolome in 1863 and its residents were left with no other choice but to abandon the place. Divided as to where they were to resettle, some went north and others went south. 

The first group, headed by Don Pablo Luciano, the Governadorcillo, organized a new settlement on the slopes of Mt. Arayat further south and named the settlement after him. Eventually, the place was renamed Magalang. 

The second group who took refuge in the north comprised the Santoses, Laxamanas, Salvadors,  Yumuls, Castros, Dizons, Pinedas, Felicianos, Aquinos, Corteses, Bermudezes, Perezes, Punsalangs and many others, and settled in a place (now called Santo Nino) then occupied by the Lindos and the Amuraos (Don Esquolastiquo Amurao and Don Gaston Amurao). 

Most of the settlers became dissatisfied with the place, as it abounded with snakes and was scarce in water. They moved further south to a place now known as Concepcion. The settlers began clearing the land and built huts and roads. After several years, they named the place Concepcion after the Immaculate Conception, who was believed to possess power over the snakes that abound in the area.

Timeline
 1863: A catastrophic flood devastated the whole town of San Bartolome, giving birth to the towns of Concepcion and Magalang.
 1897: The Katipunan was organized under General Servillano Aquino.
 1898–1900: The first municipal president, Moises Castro, was elected under the short-lived Philippine Republic under General Emilio Aguinaldo.
 1900: General Servillano Aquino was captured by the Americans and sentenced to hang. 
 1902: Captain Smith established the First American government in town and appointed Don Marciano Barrera as the first Filipino President. 
 1904: General Aquino was pardoned by order of the President of the United States, Theodore Roosevelt. 
 1911: The Gabaldon School building was constructed, costing about fifty thousand pesos (P 50,000). 
 1918: An influenza epidemic hit the town and people died by the hundreds. 
 1929: The municipal building worth fifty thousand pesos (P 50,000) and two bandstands worth five thousand pesos (P 5000) each were constructed.
 1935: The Commonwealth government was installed with Don Gregorio Palma as the municipal president. 
 1939: The town plaza, costing twenty thousand pesos (P 20,000), was fenced and named Don Benigno Q. Aquino Sr. Memorial Park.
 1942: The Japanese occupation of the town began, a period of brutalities and killings.
 1942: The military garrisons of the Imperial Japanese Army were stationed in the town. 
 1942–1944: Guerrillas and Hukbalahap communist fighters aided local troops of the Philippine Commonwealth Army in battles against the Japanese around the town during almost three years of siege.
 December 27, 1944: Japanese occupation forces left the town. The Hukbalahap took over until January 1945.
 January–August 1945: Filipino and American ground troops including guerrillas and Hukbalahap communist groups liberated the town and defeated Imperial Japanese troops; World War II ended. 
 1945: The Commonwealth government was reestablished in the town. 
 1946: On Independence Day, General Servillano Aquino and Reymundo Panlilio hoisted the Philippine flag in a simple but solemn ceremony at the Benigno Aquino Memorial Park.
 1948: Benigno Aquino Memorial High School was established. 
 1950: Citizen's Army was organized to fight all forms of communism. 
 1951: The town won as the cleanest and the most beautiful town in the Provincial Clean-up Week. 
 1952: A municipal library was established.
 1955: The political career of Ninoy Aquino began when he became the youngest mayor of Concepcion at the age of 22.
 1962: Concepcion was divided into two school districts. 
 1963: Concepcion was divided into three school districts. 
 1971: Concepcion was divided into four school districts. 
 1972: Forty days of continuous rain put the town under water. Concepcion Emergency Hospital was established.
 September 21, 1972: President Marcos declared martial law.
 1974: Lucong Bridge was reconstructed under the US-RP Aid, and the barangay market was constructed. 
 1975: The Concepcion Public Library building was constructed. 
 June 1977: Concepcion Jaycees, Inc. was organized. 
 June 17, 1978: Concepcion Educational Foundation (CEFI) was organized. 
 April 7, 1979: The Rotary Club of Southern Tarlac (RCST) was organized.
 October 8, 1979: The Land Bank of the Philippines, Concepcion Field Office was established. 
 August, 1980: Concepcion Water District was established. 
 September 25, 1980: Concepcion Water District took over the reins of MWSS.
 April 28, 1981: District Electrification Committee was organized preparatory to the organization of the Electric Cooperative. 
 June 8, 1981: Tarlac II Electric Cooperative was established covering the municipalities of Bamban, Capas, La Paz and Concepcion (Tarlac) and Zaragoza (Nueva Ecija), with Feliciano S. Garcia as president. 
 February 28, 1982: The Assemblywoman Mercedes C. Teodoro Overflow Bridge was constructed in Padpad, barangay San Jose.
 August 1, 1982: TARELCO II took over the reins of Compana Luz Electrica (CLE). 
 March 14, 1983: Barangay San Nicolas Balas became the first barangay to be powered by TARELCO II. 
 March 19, 1983: Inauguration of the approaches of the Parua River. 
 August 21, 1983: Benigno "Ninoy" Aquino was assassinated. 
 1983: Aquino Memorial High School was reconstructed. 
 1984: The public market was reconstructed under the Economic Support Fund Secretariat. 
 1986: In snap elections, Corazon C. Aquino, the widow of Ninoy Aquino was declared winner. 
 February 22–25, 1986: The EDSA Revolution took place. Corazon Aquino became the President while Alfredo Avena was declared Officer in Charge of the Office of the Mayor.
 1986: A plebiscite for the approval of the revised Constitution of the Republic of the Philippines was held. 
 1987: A bronze statue of Ninoy Aquino was erected in front of the municipal building while Herminio S. Aquino was elected Congressman for the 3rd District of Tarlac. 
 1987–88: The Concepcion – Magalang Road was paved.
 1988: Danilo D. David was elected Mayor of Concepcion. 
 May 1989: Barangay election took place.
 July 1989: Budget Secretary Guillermo Carague turned over a check worth P14 million (fourteen million pesos) to the municipal government through Mayor Danilo D. David to purchase heavy equipment. (Purchase was later made by the municipal government). 
 July 16, 1990: The 1990 Luzon earthquake devastated barangays Sto Niño, Santa Cruz, Corazon de Jesus, Pitabunan, Talimundoc San Miguel, and partly destroyed the Immaculate Conception Church.
 June 12, 1991: Mount Pinatubo erupted, bringing about extensive damage to the whole town. 
 July 22, 1991: Lahar (flowing mud and volcanic debris) destroyed Parua River dikes, wreaked havoc on nearby barangays, and totally destroyed barangays San Martin, Malupa and the southern portion of Santa Rita.
 1992: Evacuees were resettled in Camp O'Donnell. 
 March 13, 1993: Kabalikat Civicom Concepcion-Tarlac Chapter was organized and founded by several amateur radio modulators.
 May 1992: Alfredo P. Avena was elected mayor. 
 December, 1993: The construction of the Concepcion Training Center began. 
 January 27, 1994: Aquino Memorial High School was renamed Benigno S. Aquino National High School by virtue of House Bill no. 4952, authored by Rep. Herminio S. Aquino. This was enacted into law on May 4, 1994, as R.A. 7703.
 March 2001: Benjamin Lacson was elected mayor.
 2004: The Concepcion Legislative Building was constructed where the new municipal library is in the first floor and the office of the Vice Mayor is in the third floor of the building.
 May 2004: Noel L. Villanueva was elected mayor.
 2005: The bridge of Parua River was constructed to connect Barangay Sta. Rita to the other barrios in the south like San Antonio, Balutu, San Bartolome, etc., with the inauguration ceremony headed by President Gloria Macapagal Arroyo.
 2005–2007: The Immaculate Conception Parish Church was renovated.
 March 2006: For the first time in the history of Concepcion, only one candidate ran for the office of the mayor. Noel L. Villanueva automatically won.
 2007: The Municipal Building was renovated.
 October 2008: The back part of the municipal Public Market was renovated as a project of President Gloria Macapagal Arroyo.
 November 2008: The Municipality of Concepcion joined the Belenismo ng Tarlac as one of their official candidate in the Belen Making Contest held in Tarlac City every December to January.
 December 2008: As the people of Concepcion celebrated the Christmas season and the feast day of their patron saint Immaculate Conception, they also gathered for their municipality's 145th Foundation Day, on December 14 (Sunday), as part of a week of celebration every night from December 8–14.
 December 2009: Anastacio G. Yumul High School (formerly Balutu National High School) was established.
 May 2010: Noel L. Villanueva and Andres D. Lacson were elected as Mayor and Vice Mayor, respectively.
 August 7, 2010: Caluluan High School (CHS) held its first grand alumni homecoming in celebration of its 44-year founding anniversary. The event was spearheaded by the school principal, Mario M. Tayag, together with the school faculty. A highlight of the event was the founding of CHS Alumni Association and election of officers.
 May 2013 – Andres D. Lacson was elected as mayor while former mayor Noel L. Villanueva was elected congressman of the third District of Tarlac.
 August 21, 2014 – The newly renovated B.S. Aquino Memorial Plaza was inaugurated.
 September 2014 – China Bank opened a branch in Concepcion, marking the entry of big business and investors in the town.
 October 28, 2015 – East West Bank opened a branch in Concepcion.
 June 21, 2017 – City Mall SCTEx community mall in Concepcion.
 June 30, 2017 – SM Savemore Market opened a branch.
 October 12, 2017 – Walter Mart opened its 25th Community Mall with fast food chains such as Chowking, Mang Inasal, and Giligan's Restaurant.
 November 17, 2017 – Puregold opens a branch in Concepcion.
 July 24, 2018 – Bank of the Philippine Islands opened a branch in Concepcion.
 2018 – Continued Commerce and Trade Boom in the Town of Concepcion
 May 13, 2019 – Mayor Andres D. Lacson re-elected Mayor of Concepcion; Vice Mayor Joey L. Baluyut elected
 May 9, 2022 – Mayor Noel L. Villanueva elected Mayor of Concepcion; Vice-Mayor Carla P. Bautista elected

Mission and Vision

Mission 
Our mission is to serve our constituents with integrity, transparency, and accountability. We aim to promote inclusive growth, sustainable development, and equitable access to basic services for all. We will work tirelessly to ensure the safety and security of our people, preserve our natural resources, and build a resilient community that is prepared to face any challenges that may come our way.

Vision 
Our vision is to become a progressive and dynamic municipality that is known for its strong community spirit, vibrant economy, and sustainable development. We envision a future where our people live in safe and resilient communities, have access to quality education, healthcare, and basic services, and enjoy a high standard of living. We will work towards creating an environment that attracts investments, fosters entrepreneurship, and provides opportunities for growth and development for all. Our ultimate goal is to build a municipality that our people are proud to call home.

Geography 
Concepcion is one of the largest municipalities of the province of Tarlac. It is 7.5 kilometers from the Capas junction along McArthur Highway. It lies on the south-eastern tip of Tarlac, bordered in the south by Magalang, Pampanga, in the east by San Antonio, Nueva Ecija, in the north-east by La Paz, in the north-west by Tarlac City, in the west by Capas, and in the south-west by Bamban.

It has two great rivers, the first being Lucong River which originates from Dingding and Namria creeks in Capas, Tarlac; it is visible from the bridge at Barangay Santiago, and merges with the Rio Chico before joining the Pampanga River. The second is Parua River, which originates from the Sacobia-Bamban river that comes from Mount Pinatubo. Parua River is heavily silted with 7 meters of sand deposits; its bridge was destroyed by lahar and is visible at Barangay San Nicolas Balas. It also merges with the Rio Chico before joining Pampanga River. Both rivers are utilized to irrigate the town's agricultural lands, consisting mainly of rice and sugar crops. Parua River, which at times appears as a bed of sand due to the scarcity of water, is also a quarry site for sand and ash used as construction material.

Barangays 
Concepcion is politically subdivided into 45 barangays:

Climate

Demographics

Economy

Tourism

 Aquino Family Ancestral House – The marker was unveiled by President Aquino, III on September 10, 2011. (Ancestral houses of the Philippines).
 Santuario de la Immaculada Concepción (formerly Immaculate Conception Parish Church) belongs to the Roman Catholic Diocese of Tarlac (Latin: Dioecesis Tarlacensis) under the current bishop, Florentino Ferrer Cinense, appointed in 1988, and under the Vicariate of the Immaculate Conception, Vicar Forane: Msgr. Tirso Daquigan, Parish Priest, Titular: Immaculate Conception, Feast day, December 8). Fr. Melvin P. Castro, Chancellor.
 Col. Jesus R. Lapus Memorial Sports Complex
 Ninoy Aquino Monument (bronze statue)
 Concepcion Municipal Hall (depicted on the back of the 500-peso bill)
 Orchard Valley Resort

 Voice of America Relay Station (also used by the Philippine Broadcasting Service for shortwave station DZRP Radyo Pilipinas Worldwide)

Notable personalities
 Ninoy Aquino (from Barangay San Jose Pob.) – the youngest municipal mayor of Concepcion (1955–1959); subsequently the youngest governor of the Tarlac province, a Philippine senator and a leader of the opposition to the autocratic rule of Ferdinand Marcos. He was assassinated at Manila International Airport (now named Ninoy Aquino International Airport in his honor) upon returning home from exile in the United States. His death catapulted his widow, Corazon Aquino, to the limelight and the presidency, subsequently replacing the 20-year-old Marcos regime.
 Benigno Aquino Sr. (from Barangay San Agustin Murcia) - a Philippine senator and served as Speaker of the Second Philippine Republic National Assembly from 1943 to 1944. he is the father of Ninoy Aquino.
 Eva Estrada-Kalaw (from Barangay San Agustin Murcia) - a Philippine senator and served as a congresswoman in the Congress of the Philippines for 7 years. (1965–1972). Serving in Congress during the presidency of Ferdinand Marcos (Nationalist), she was part of a major transformation in Philippine domestic and foreign policies.
 Jesli Aquino Lapus (from Barangay San Nicolas Pob.) – a former Congressman of the 3rd District of Tarlac and former Secretary of Department of Trade and Industry as of 2010. He also served as Secretary of Education from 2006 to 2010.
 Lorna Tolentino (from Barangay Minane) – a multi-awarded actress and TV host.
 Tyron Perez (from Barangay Alfonso) – a model and actor on GMA Network's reality talent competition show, StarStruck.
 Mary Joy Baron - Philippine Woman's National Team Mainstay, 1st Best Middle Blocker 2019 ASEAN Grand Prix

Education
There are five public high schools and a private tertiary college in the municipality:
Anastacio G. Yumul High School (formerly Balutu National High School), located at Barangay Balutu
Benigno S. Aquino National High School, located at Barangay San Nicolas Poblacion
Caluluan National High School (main), located at Barangay Caluluan
Caluluan National High School (annex), located at Barangay Pando
Santa Rosa National High School, located at Barangay Santa Rosa
Concepcion Holy Cross College, located at Barangay Minane
Concepcion Catholic School, located at Barangay San Nicolas Poblacion, Dizon Street

References

External links

Concepcion Profile at PhilAtlas.com
[ Philippine Standard Geographic Code]
Philippine Census Information
Local Governance Performance Management System

Municipalities of Tarlac